The 1976 United States presidential election in South Dakota was held on November 2, 1976 as part of the 1976 United States presidential election. Incumbent President Gerald Ford won the state of South Dakota, defeating Democratic candidate Jimmy Carter by a slim margin of 1.48%. Ford won all four of the state's electoral votes, but lost the national election to Carter.

Despite Ford’s narrow victory, South Dakota is a reliably Republican state. South Dakota weighed in as 4 points more Republican than the national average. , this is the last election in which Codington County, Edmunds County, Faulk County, Gregory County, and McCook County voted for a Democratic presidential candidate. This is also the last time a Democrat won any of South Dakota's congressional districts, namely the 1st, as both it and the 2nd would be eliminated after the 1980 census.

Results

Results by county

See also
 United States presidential elections in South Dakota

References

South Dakota
United States presidential